Nattenbergstadion is a multi-use stadium in Lüdenscheid, Germany. It is currently used mostly for football matches and hosts the home matches of Rot-Weiß Lüdenscheid. The stadium is able to hold 17,000 people.

Football venues in Germany
Athletics (track and field) venues in Germany
Lüdenscheid
Sports venues in North Rhine-Westphalia
Buildings and structures in Märkischer Kreis